James Francis Hardy (April 24, 1923 – August 16, 2019) was an American football quarterback. He was born in Los Angeles.

High school career
Hardy attended and played high school football at Fairfax High School in Los Angeles.

College career
Hardy played college football at the University of Southern California. He was voted most valuable player of the 1945 Rose Bowl game, won by USC 25-0 over Tennessee.

Professional career
Hardy was drafted in the first round (eighth overall) of the 1945 NFL Draft by the Washington Redskins.  He played in the National Football League between 1946 and 1952.  He made the Pro Bowl in 1950. Hardy is perhaps most famous for throwing an NFL-record eight interceptions in a single game, as well as for the worst touchdown pass-interception differential in a single game (-8), in a 45-7 loss to the Philadelphia Eagles on September 24, 1950.

He later served as the general manager of the Los Angeles Memorial Coliseum. In September 2016, Hardy was interviewed and reflected upon his career in the NFL. Prior to his death, Hardy was the oldest living member of the inaugural 1946 Los Angeles Rams.

References

1923 births
2019 deaths
American football quarterbacks
Chicago Cardinals players
Detroit Lions players
Eastern Conference Pro Bowl players
Fairfax High School (Los Angeles) alumni
Los Angeles Rams players
USC Trojans football players
Players of American football from Los Angeles